Mahira Hafeez Khan (born 21 December 1984) is a Pakistani actress. She started her career as a VJ in 2006. Khan is best known for portraying the role of Khirad Hussain in the romantic-drama Humsafar for which she received numerous accolades, including Lux Style Award for Satellite Best TV Actress and Hum Award for Best On-screen Couple with Fawad Khan.

She made her big screen debut opposite Atif Aslam in the romance Bol (2011), which earned her a Lux Style Award for Best Film Actress nomination. Khan made her Bollywood debut in 2017 with action-romance Raees opposite Shah Rukh Khan. She has also acted in successful Pakistani films Bin Roye (2015), Ho Mann Jahaan (2015), 7 Din Mohabbat In (2018) and Superstar (2019). She made her debut as a producer with sports web series Baarwan Khiladi (2022).

Early life
Khan was born in Karachi, Pakistan on 21 December 1984 to an Urdu-speaking Muhajir family of Pashtun ancestry. Her father, Hafeez Khan, was born in Delhi, British India, and migrated to Pakistan after the partition of India.

Khan attended Foundation Public School from where she completed her O-Levels. At the age of 17, she moved to California for higher education, where she attended Santa Monica College. She then enrolled in the University of Southern California for her bachelor's degree. However, she did not complete her undergraduate degree and returned to Pakistan in 2008. During her studies in the United States, she was a cashier at a Rite Aid store in Los Angeles.

Personal life 
Khan met Ali Askari in 2006 in Los Angeles and married him in 2007 in a traditional Islamic wedding ceremony despite Khan's father being reportedly against the marriage. They have a son, born in 2009. The couple got divorced in 2015.

Career

Early work (2006–2011) 

Khan started her career as a VJ in 2006, hosting the live show Most Wanted on MTV Pakistan which was aired three days a week. She then hosted AAG TV's reality show Weekends with Mahira in 2008, where she played music videos, spoke to celebrity guests and took phone calls from viewers.

In 2011, Khan made her film debut in a supporting role in Shoaib Mansoor-directed Bol in which she had a supporting role. She played Ayesha, a girl from a conservative lower-middle-class family living in old part of Lahore, who shares a mutual passion for music with her love interest Mustafa, played by Atif Aslam. The film was a critical and commercial success, and became one of the highest-grossing Pakistani films of all time. The same year, Khan also made her TV drama debut in Neeyat directed by Mehreen Jabbar. The serial was set in New York and she played the role of Ayla.

Breakthrough and recognition (2012–2017) 

She next appeared in the Sarmad Khoosat-directed drama serial Humsafar. Both the drama and Khan received positive reviews from critics. The drama series was also aired on Zindagi and was a success in India. It earned her a Lux Style Award for Satellite Best TV Actress and a Hum Award for Best Onscreen Couple. In 2013, she played the role in Sarmad Khoosat-directed Shehr-e-Zaat. The drama earned her Best Actress Awards from Pakistan Media Awards and Hum Awards. From 2013 to 2014, she hosted TUC The Lighter Side of Life, a talk show.

In 2014, Khan starred in Mohammed Ehteshamuddin directed drama serial Sadqay Tumhare in which she played the role of Shano. The drama earned her a Lux Style Award for Best TV Actress, two Hum Awards and a Hum Award nomination. In 2015, she starred opposite Humayun Saeed in Shahzad Kashmiri's directed film Bin Roye. The film earned her a Lux Style Award
for Best Actress (Film), Hum Award for Best Actress, Hum Style Award for Most Stylish Actress (Film) and a Masala! Award for Best Actress. The film was also adapted as a TV series in 2016, which earned her a Hum Award for Best Actor Female (Drama Serial) and a Hum Award nomination for Best Onscreen Couple. She played a supporting role in Sarmad Khoosat-directed biographical film Manto in 2015.

In 2016, she starred in Asim Raza-directed film Ho Mann Jahaan, The film earned her a Lux Style Award for Best Actress (Film) and a Nigar Award nomination for Best Actress.

In early 2017, Khan co-starred in Rahul Dholakia's Indian film Raees, which was her debut in the Hindi film industry. Before the release of film, 'Indian Motion Picture Producers Association' (IMPPA) and 'The Film Producers Guild of India' had decided to ban all Pakistani actors, actresses and technicians from working in India due to the tensions created after the 2016 Uri attack, until the situation was normalised. Reportedly, there were rumours that Khan's scenes would be deleted from the film or she would be replaced by another actress. Shah Rukh Khan, the lead star and co-producer of the film, said that she would not be allowed to promote the film in India. Khan repeatedly received threats from Shiv Sena, an Indian far-right political party. Despite the controversies, the film was released in January 2017 and was a modest commercial success, earning over ₹3.0 billion (US$39 million) worldwide which made Khan the first Pakistani actress to join Bollywood's 100 Crore Club and become the top grossing actress in Bollywood during the first quarter of 2017.

Success and recent work (2018–present) 

Khan began her singing career in 2017, when she starred as a rape victim in Shoaib Mansoor's social drama film Verna. The film received generally unfavourable reviews but her performance was praised and she earned a Lux Style Award for Best Actress in 2018. In 2018, she starred in Meenu Gaur-Farjad Nabi's romantic comedy 7 Din Mohabbat In which was a commercial failure In 2019, she made a special appearance in Asim Raza's Parey Hut Love. The same year, she starred in romantic, musical-drama film Superstar, her highest-grossing film domestically at the time.

In 2022, she starred opposite Fahad Mustafa in Nabeel Qureshi's action-comedy film Quaid-e-Azam Zindabad which opened to mixed reviews from critics. She has also produced a web series titled Baarwan Khiladi, which was release in March 2022. Khan next starred in Bilal Lashari's Punjabi-language action drama film The Legend of Maula Jatt alongside Fawad Khan which was also starring Hamza Ali Abbasi and Humaima Malik. The film released in October 2022 and was widely praised by critics. however Khan's performance was less well received, Syed Zain Raza of The Friday Times wrote "One can’t deny the star power of Mahira, but it would be better to say that this wasn’t her film. Mukkho wasn’t meant for her" while Siham Basir, of Dawn Images wrote "The only downside for me was Mahira Khan’s Mukkho, Her Punjabi accent needed a lot of work because her performance fell flat".

Other work and media image 

Khan is considered one of the Pakistan's most popular and highest-paid actresses. She has received several awards. In 2012, Khan was named as the Most Beautiful Woman in Pakistan. In 'Sexiest Asian Women' poll by Eastern Eye, she was listed tenth in 2015, ninth in 2016 and fifth in 2017, and ninth again in 2019. She was also called Pakistan's sexiest woman.

Khan co-hosted the ceremonies of 10th Lux Style Awards in 2010, 1st Hum Awards in 2013 and 14th Lux Style Awards in 2015. In December 2016, Khan became a victim of false news after anti-India comment emerged ahead of the release of her Bollywood debut film Raees.

She serves as an ambassador for a number of brands such as Lux, QMobile, Gai Power Wash, Huawei, Sunsilk, Veet, and L'Oréal. Khan was on the list of the BBC's 100 Women announced on 23 November 2020.

M By Mahira 
Mahira Khan launched her clothing line titled "M By Mahira".

Filmography

Films

Television

Web series

Other appearance

Awards and nominations 

! Ref
|- 
! style="background:#bfd7ff;" colspan="5"|Lux Style Awards
|-
| 2013
| Humsafar
| Satellite Best TV Actress
|
|
|-
| rowspan="2" | 2016
| Bin Roye
| Best Lead Actress in a Film
|
| rowspan="2" |
|-
| Sadqay Tumhare
| Best TV Actress
|
|-
| 2017
| Ho Mann Jahaan
| Best Lead Actress in a Film
|
|
|-
| 2018
| Verna
| Best Lead Actress in a Film
|
|
|-
| Rowspan="2"|2020
| rowspan="2"|Superstar
| Best Film Actress (Viewers' Choice)
| rowspan="2" 
| rowspan="2"|
|-
| Best Film Actress (Critics' Choice)
|-
| rowspan="2" | 2022
| rowspan="2" | Hum Kahan Ke Sachay Thay
| Best TV Actress-Viewers' Choice	
| 
| rowspan="2" |
|-
| Best TV Actress-Critics' Choice	
|
|-
! style="background:#bfd7ff;" colspan="5"|Pakistan Media Awards
|- 
| 2014
| Shehr-e-Zaat
| Best Actress (Drama)
|
|
|-
! style="background:#bfd7ff;" colspan="5"|Hum Awards
|-
| rowspan="2" | 2013
| Shehr-e-Zaat
| Best Actress (Drama)
|
| rowspan="2" |
|-
| Humsafar
| Best Onscreen Couple (Drama)
|
|-
| rowspan="3" | 2015
| rowspan="3" | Sadqay Tumhare 
| Best Actress (Drama)
|
| rowspan="3" |
|-
| Best Actress Popular
|
|-
| Best Onscreen Couple (Drama)
|
|-
| 2016
| Bin Roye
| Recognition Award – Films
|
|
|-
| rowspan="4" | 2017
| rowspan="4" | Bin Roye
| Best Actress Popular (Drama)
|
|
|-
| Best Onscreen Couple Popular (Drama)
|
| rowspan="3" |
|-
| Best Onscreen Couple Jury (Drama)
|
|-
| Best Actress Jury (Drama)
|
|-
| 2018
| Verna
| Recognition Award – Films
|
|
|-
| rowspan="2" | 2022
| rowspan="2" | Hum Kahan Ke Sachay Thay
| Best Actress - Popular
|
|
|-
| Best on-screen Couple - Popular
|
|
|-
! style="background:#bfd7ff;" colspan="5"|Hum Style Awards
|-
| 2016
|colspan=2|Most Stylish Actress (Film)
|
|
|-
| 2017
|colspan=2|Most Stylish Actress (Television)
|
|
|-
| rowspan="2" | 2018
|colspan=2|Most Stylish Actress (Film)
|
|
|-
|colspan=2|Style Icon of the Year
|
|
|-
| 2020
| colspan=2|Most Stylish Actress (Film) 
|
|
|-
! style="background:#bfd7ff;" colspan="5"|Nigar Awards
|-
| 2017
| Ho Mann Jahaan
| Best Actress 
|
|
|-
! style="background:#bfd7ff;" colspan="5"|International Pakistan Prestige Awards
|-
| 2017
| Ho Mann Jahaan
| Best Actress (Film)
|
|
|-
|2018
|Verna
|Best Actress (Film)
|
|
|-
! style="background:#bfd7ff;" colspan="5"|Indus Valley International Film Festival
|-
|2022
| Prince Charming
|Best Actress
|
|
|}

Other recognition

See also 
 List of Pakistani actresses

References

External links

 
 

1984 births
Living people
Actresses from Karachi
Pakistani film actresses
Pakistani television actresses
Muhajir people
Pashtun people
Actresses in Urdu cinema
Actresses in Hindi cinema
Pakistani expatriate actresses in India
Pakistani expatriates in the United States
Santa Monica College alumni
University of Southern California alumni
21st-century Pakistani actresses
BBC 100 Women